Ronald Oscar "Ron" Williams (born 20 July 1963) is a former New Zealand rugby union player. A prop, Williams represented North Harbour at a provincial level, and was a member of the New Zealand national side, the All Blacks, in 1988 and 1989. He played 10 tour games for the All Blacks but did not play in any test matches. He later played four tests, including one as captain, for Fiji between 1994 and 1995.

References

1963 births
Living people
Sportspeople from Suva
People educated at Westlake Boys High School
New Zealand rugby union players
New Zealand international rugby union players
Fiji international rugby union players
Rugby union props
North Harbour rugby union players
Auckland rugby union players
Fijian people of British descent
Fijian expatriates in New Zealand